Southbound is a Penang (Malaysia)-based independent scholarly publishing house. It focuses on issues relating to participatory information and communication processes in development.

According to its website, its authors come from both the South and the North. 

Southbound's books have been translated into Arabic, Indonesian, Chinese, French, Hindi, Japanese, and Spanish. Its publisher is Chin Saik Yoon. It is based at Suite 20F, Northam House, 55 Jalan Sultan Ahmad Shah 10050 Penang Malaysia.

External links

Southbound website

Book publishing companies of Malaysia
Privately held companies of Malaysia